Awarua Street railway station is one of eight stations on the Johnsonville Branch, a branch railway north of Wellington in New Zealand’s North Island, and serves the suburb of Ngaio.  It is one of two stations that were added to the line when it was upgraded prior to being reopened as the Johnsonville Branch. It is one of four stations on the line located on a curve; before arrival at the Crofton Downs or Awarua Street stations, the onboard announcement adds Please mind the gap when exiting the train.

Electric multiple unit trains are operated under the Metlink brand through this station in both directions to Johnsonville (to the north) and Wellington (to the south).

History 
As part of the upgrade of the section of the old Wellington and Manawatu Railway between Wellington and Johnsonville, two new stations were constructed, Awarua Street and Simla Crescent. The newly electrified Johnsonville Branch officially opened on 2 July 1938, with services to all stations from Monday 4 July. The two new stations had been used by some steam trains from 10 January 1938.

Over the summer of 2008/09, the platform of the station was entirely demolished to be replaced by a brand new platform that could accommodate six carriages, as opposed to four. The replaced platform is twice the length of the old platform.

Services 
Trains run in both directions through this station, departing at half-hourly intervals, supplemented by a 13/13/26 schedule at peak times on week days.

The closest bus route is #26, which passes by the end of Awarua Street along Ottawa Road.

Facilities 
The station has a single side platform and passenger shelter.  Pedestrian access to the station is via a walkway from Awarua Street near the rail bridge over Awarua Street, or from a long flight of steps down from Fox Street to the north end of the platform.  There is no dedicated station car park available.

Footnotes

External links 

 Train timetables from Metlink.

Rail transport in Wellington
Public transport in the Wellington Region
Buildings and structures in Wellington City
Railway stations in New Zealand
Railway stations opened in 1938